Jesper Rönndahl (born 27 June 1979) is a Swedish TV-host, stand-up comedian and radio personality.

Biography
Rönndahl was born and raised in Veberöd, Skåne County and began his career in stand-up comedy in 2006, before appearing regularly on the radio show Pang Prego on Sveriges Radio P3 (SR P3). He also appeared on Hej Domstol!, Morgonpasset, Söndag Hela Veckan and P3 Hiphop.

In 2010, he won the award for best newcomer at the Swedish Stand-up Awards. He previously lived in Malmö, before moving to Stockholm where he currently resides. From 2018 to 2019, he was the presenter of satirical programme Svenska nyheter on SVT1.

Rönndahl will host Melodifestivalen 2023 along with Farah Abadi.

Controversies

China incident
On 21 September 2018, Svenska Nyheter hosted by Rönndahl broadcast a segment making fun of a Chinese family claiming police mistreatment during a trip to Stockholm, while the end of the segment featured a short "informational film for Chinese tourists" dubbed in Chinese, which featured a variety of perceived racist stereotypes against Asians in Sweden, such as public defecation and dog-meat consumption.

References

External links

 

1979 births
Living people
People from Lund Municipality
Swedish male comedians
Swedish stand-up comedians
Swedish radio personalities
21st-century Swedish comedians